Events in the year 1876 in Japan.

Incumbents
Emperor: Emperor Meiji
Empress consort: Empress Shōken

Governors
Aichi Prefecture: Taihe Yasujo
Akita Prefecture: Ishida Eikichi 
Aomori Prefecture: J. Hishida
Ehime Prefecture: Takatoshi Iwamura
Fukushima Prefecture: Morisuke Yamayoshi
Gifu Prefecture: Toshi Kozaki
Gunma Prefecture: vacant 
Hiroshima Prefecture: Fujii Tsutomu
Ibaraki Prefecture: .....
Iwate Prefecture: Korekiyo Shima
Kagawa Prefecture: Nitta Yoshio then Kunitake Watanabe
Kochi Prefecture: Iwasaki Nagatake then Kunitake Watanabe
Kyoto Prefecture: Masanao Makimura
Mie Prefecture: Sadamedaka Iwamura
Miyazaki Prefecture: Weiken Fukuyama
Nagano Prefecture: Narasaki Hiroshi
Niigata Prefecture: Nagayama Sheng Hui
Oita Prefecture: Kei Morishita then Shinichi Kagawa
Osaka Prefecture: Norobu Watanabe
Saga Prefecture: Hidotemo Kitashima
Saitama Prefecture: Tasuke Shirane
Shiname Prefecture: Kamiyama Ren
Tochigi Prefecture: Iseki Ushitora
Tokyo: Masataka Kusumoto
Toyama Prefecture: Hidenori Yamada
Yamaguchi Prefecture: Mishima Michitsune

Events
October 24–25 - Shinpūren Rebellion
October 27-November 24 - Akizuki Rebellion
October 28-November 5 - Hagi Rebellion

Births
February 23 - Senjiro Hayashi

Deaths
Otaguro Tomoo

References 

 
1870s in Japan
Years of the 19th century in Japan